Óscar Antonio Linton Bethancourt (born 29 January 1993) is a Panamanian professional footballer who plays as a defender.

Career
In 2020, Linton signed for Sliema Wanderers, Malta's most successful team. After six months in Japan, Linton returned to help Sliema in the second half of the 2021–22 campaign.

References

External links
 
 

Living people
1993 births
Sportspeople from Panama City
Panamanian footballers
Association football defenders
Panama international footballers
Panama youth international footballers
Liga Panameña de Fútbol players
Chepo FC players
Costa del Este F.C. players
Sliema Wanderers F.C. players
Panamanian expatriate footballers
Panamanian expatriate sportspeople in Malta
Expatriate footballers in Malta
Panamanian expatriate sportspeople in Japan
Expatriate footballers in Japan